Trichodiadema rogersiae is a succulent plant of the genus Trichodiadema, indigenous to arid areas of the Eastern Cape Province, South Africa.

References

rogersiae
Taxa named by Louisa Bolus